= Exeter Tutorial College =

Coordinates: 50.721°N 3.518°W

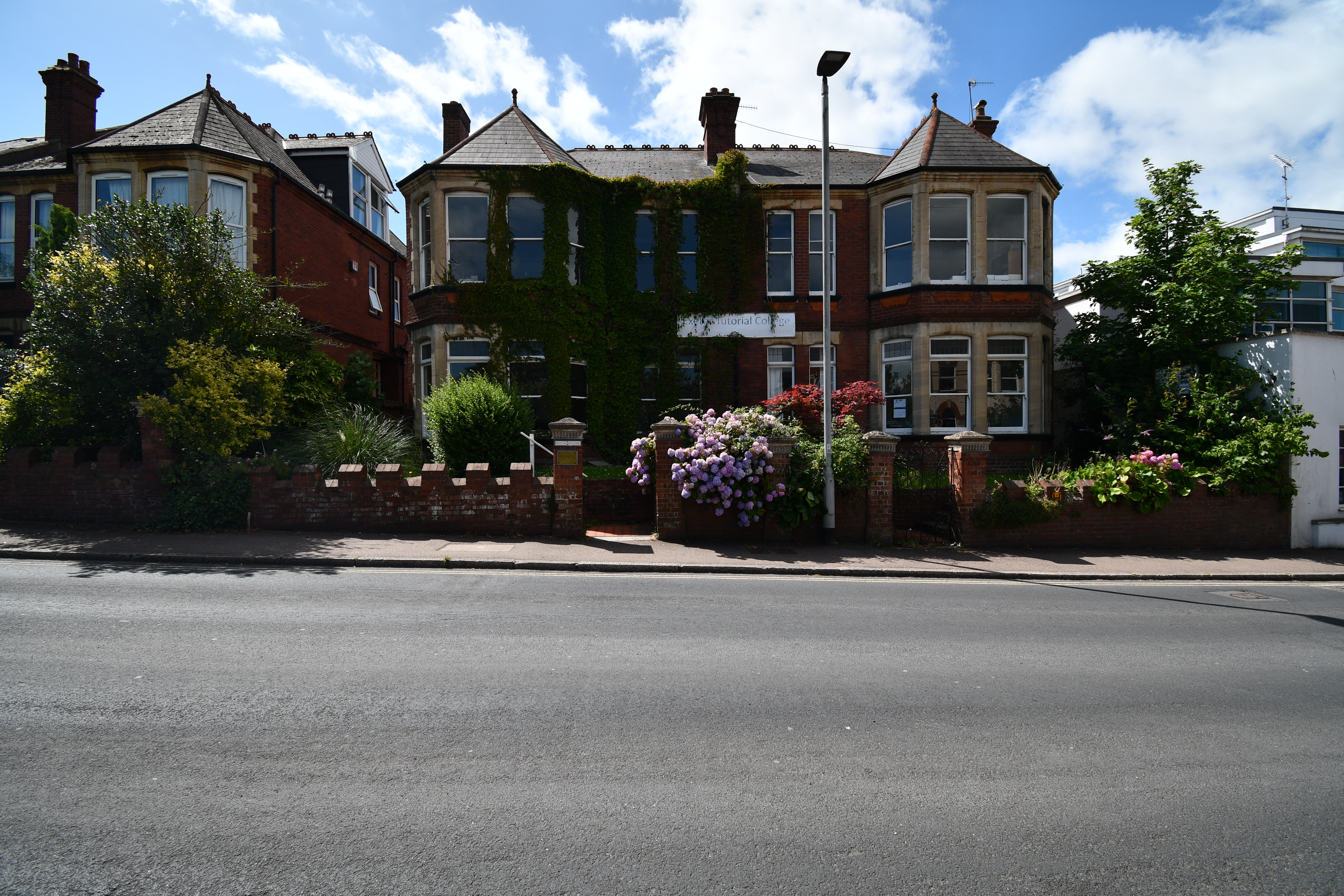

Location
- 44–46 Magdalen Road; Exeter, Devon, EX2 4TE; England

Information
- Established: 1984
- Closed: 2020
- Ofsted: Reports
- Principal: Ken Jack
- Gender: Coeducational
- Age: 15 to 21
- Enrollment: ~40
- School fees: £6,240–£10,905

Exeter Tutorial College was a small private school and sixth form located in Exeter, Devon, England. The school was founded in 1984 and closed in 2020. The school offered a selection of A level subjects taught over one year for students hoping to improve their existing results, as well as GCSEs and English for overseas students.

== Reputation and external recognition ==
As of the latest inspection in December 2019, the colleges Managerial team was rated 'inadequate' by Ofsted, and the college subsequently closed their OFSTED registration on 30 January 2020. Thereafter, the college successfully continued to teach their current cohort during the Covid crisis.
